DAVA Foods A/S (formerly Hedegaard Foods A/S) is a Danish food manufacturing, distribution and packing company based in Hadsund, Denmark, specialising in eggs. The group has subsidiaries in Denmark, Norway, Sweden, Finland, and Estonia and is the largest supplier of whole fresh eggs in the Nordic region. Since 2008, it has been a subsidiary of Dan Agro Holding A/S, a division of DLA Group.

Company
, DAVA Foods has divisions in Denmark, Norway, Sweden, Finland, and Estonia, and a packaging division, and also exports its products primarily to the Faeroes, Germany, the Czech Republic, Lithuania, Great Britain, the Middle East, and Latvia. The group's products include fresh eggs and pasteurised and boiled egg products.

History

Hedegaard Foods originated in the 1980 purchase by the Danish conglomerate  of Farm Æg, a small egg producer in Hadsund; the company changed its name to Hedegaard Foods in 1999. In 2008 Dan Agro Holding, a division of DLA Group, acquired the company from Hedegaard. The company moved to a larger facility in Hadsund in 2014.

The company expanded by acquisitions, including of the third-largest egg packer in Denmark, Brødrene Honum in 2002, which also diversified the company into food manufacturing, and the fourth-largest, Møllebjerggård Æg, in 2010. In 2011–2013, they acquired Svenska Lantägg AB, the largest egg packing company in Sweden. In 2014 they acquired a 50% share in Munakunta, the largest egg packing and pasteurised egg production company in Finland, and established a Finnish subsidiary, Muna Foods Oy. In 2015 they acquired OU Koks Munatootmine in Estonia from HKScan. After their name change to DAVA Foods, they acquired a controlling interest in the Norwegian company Eggprodukter AS in 2016, and in the Finnish company Närpes Äggpackeri Ab in 2019.

In August 2014, the company recalled a significant proportion of their products after finding salmonella contamination which was traced to eggs from a farm in Grindsted.

Hedegaard Foods changed its name to DAVA Foods (for Danish Agro, Vestjyllands andel) in November 2015, but continued to market its products under the names of its various subsidiaries until the second half of 2019, when the Hedegaard brand name was phased out in Denmark.

References

External links

 Official website
 English website

1980 establishments in Denmark
Food and drink companies of Denmark
Hadsund